The 25th Ryder Cup Matches were held October 14–16, 1983 at the PGA National Golf Club in Palm Beach Gardens, Florida.
The United States team won the competition by a score of 14 to 13 points, the closest Ryder Cup since the tie in 1969. In their third competition with players from the continent, Europe showed the ability to realistically challenge the Americans. This was the first of four occasions that Tony Jacklin was the European captain and the sole occasion that his side lost.

Entering the singles matches on Sunday, the competition was even at 8 points each. Jacklin put his best players out early, while U.S. captain Jack Nicklaus saved his for last. In the first match, Seve Ballesteros was 3 up at the turn but needed an outstanding 3-wood from a fairway bunker on the final hole to salvage par and force a half with Fuzzy Zoeller. With ten matches complete and the score at 13 points each, the outcome depended on the two singles matches remaining on the course, between José María Cañizares and Lanny Wadkins and Bernard Gallacher and Tom Watson. The U.S. victory is generally accredited to Wadkins, who hit a wedge to less than three feet (0.9 m) on the par-5 18th hole to win the hole with a birdie and halve his match against Canizares. Gallacher had trailed all day, but Watson bogeyed 16 and was only 1 up with two holes to play. He had another bogey at the par-3 17th, but Gallacher's three-foot putt  for bogey missed and ended the match at 2 & 1 and gave the U.S. the winning point. 

This was the 13th consecutive win at home for the U.S. team, but they would have to wait until the 2021 Ryder Cup to post consecutive home victories. It was also the last victory for the U.S. in the Ryder Cup for eight years, until 1991.

Format
The Ryder Cup is a match play event, with each match worth one point.  The competition format in 1983 was as follows:
Day 1 — 4 foursome (alternate shot) matches in a morning session and 4 four-ball (better ball) matches in an afternoon session
Day 2 — 4 four-ball matches in a morning session and 4 foursome matches in an afternoon session
Day 3 — 12 singles matches
With a total of 28 points, 14 points were required to win the Cup.  All matches were played to a maximum of 18 holes.

Teams
The American qualification rules remained unchanged from 1981 with 11 of the team being selected from a points list. The final place in the team was allocated to the winner of the 1983 PGA Championship (which finished on August 7), provided he was not in the top 11, in which case the 12th player in the points list would qualify. Qualification based on the points list finished after the Western Open on July 3. Tom Watson needed to win the final event to guarantee his place but finished second, lifting him from 14th to 12th place in the points list and pushing Hale Irwin out of that position. The PGA Championship was won by Hal Sutton with Jack Nicklaus second. Sutton was only in his third year as a professional and hence ineligible and so Watson retained his place on the team.

The European team was chosen entirely from the 1983 European Tour money list as at the conclusion of the St. Mellion Timeshare TPC on September 18. Prior to the final event 10 of the players had guaranteed their places with Manuel Piñero in 11th position and Gordon J. Brand in 12th. Brand made sure of his place with fifth place in the TPC but Piñero was overtaken by Paul Way who finished second to lift him to 11th place in the list.

Friday's matches
October 14, 1983

Morning foursomes

Afternoon four-ball

Saturday's matches
October 15, 1983

Morning four-ball

Afternoon foursomes

Sunday's singles matches
October 16, 1983

Individual player records
Each entry refers to the win–loss–half record of the player.

Source:

United States

Europe

Video
2012 Ryder Cup   Ryder Cup Flashback: 1983

References

External links
PGA of America: 1983 Ryder Cup
About.com: 1983 Ryder Cup

Ryder Cup
Golf in Florida
Sports competitions in Florida
Sports in Palm Beach County, Florida
Ryder Cup
Ryder Cup
Ryder Cup
Ryder Cup